Actias groenendaeli is a moth of the family Saturniidae first described by Roepke in 1954. It is found in Indonesia.

Subspecies
Actias groenendaeli groenendaeli (Flores)
Actias groenendaeli acutapex Kishida, 2000 (Sumba)
Actias groenendaeli sumbawaensis U. Paukstadt , L.H. Paukstadt & Rougerie, 2010 (Sumbawa)
Actias groenendaeli timorensis U. Paukstadt , L.H. Paukstadt & Rougerie, 2010 (Timor)

References

 , 2000: A new subspecies of Actias groenendaeli Roepke, 1954 (Lepidoptera, Saturniidae) from Sumba I., Indonesia. Transactions of the Lepidopterological Society of Japan 52(1): 11-12. Abstract and full article: .
 , 1994: Notes on the systematics of the maenas-group of the genus Actias Leach 1815 (Lepidoptera: Saturniidae). Nachrichten des Entomologischen Vereins Apollo N.F. 15 (3): 327–338.
 , 1992: Beschreibung des bisher unbekannten Männchens von Actias groenendaeli Roepke 1954, n. stat., von Flores, Indonesien (Lepidoptera: Saturniidae). Entomologische Zeitschrift 102 (11): 193-197.
  & , 2014: Ein neuer wilder Seidenspinner vom Banggai-Archipel, Indonesien: Actias isis pelengensis subsp. nov. (Lepidoptera: Saturniidae). Beiträge zur Kenntnis der wilden Seidenspinner (Wilhelmshaven), 12 (2): 66-82.
 , 2010: Beitrag zur Kenntnis von Actias groenendaeli Roepke, 1954 von den Kleinen Sundainseln, Indonesien, mit zwei Neubeschreibungen: Actias groenendaeli timorensis subsp. nov. und A. groenendaeli sumbawaensis subsp. nov. (Lepidoptera: Saturniidae). Beiträge zur Kenntnis der wilden Seidenspinner (Wilhelmshaven), 8 (3): 125-153.

Groenendaeli
Moths of Indonesia
Moths described in 1954